John Hartley Howman  (8 November 1919 – 2 February 2002) served as a Rhodesian Front Member of Parliament in Salisbury and the Minister of Tourism and Information in the cabinet of Prime Minister Ian Smith. He became Rhodesian minister of external affairs and defence in September 1968.

He was one of the signatories to the Unilateral Declaration of Independence on 11 November 1965. He was also Minister of African Education until 1963. Howman was one of Smith's closest confidants and friends in his cabinet and accompanied him to the Gibraltar Conferences in 1966 and 1968.

References

1919 births
2000 deaths
People from Midlands Province
Rhodesian Front politicians
Foreign ministers of Rhodesia
South African people of British descent
White Rhodesian people
Signatories of Rhodesia's Unilateral Declaration of Independence
Members of the Legislative Assembly of Southern Rhodesia
Members of the Parliament of Rhodesia
Alumni of Plumtree School
Zimbabwean emigrants to South Africa
Defence Ministers of Zimbabwe